Dream Express (DEX) Co., Ltd. or DEX is a Thai anime licensing company based in Bangkok. It was founded on 9 July 1999 then start anime licensor business in 2002. The anime series that were licensed by this company include One Piece, Kamen Rider Series (since Heisei series), Ultra Series, Gundam Series, and Love Live! series.

References

External links
DEX corporate site
DexClub

Companies based in Bangkok
Entertainment companies of Thailand
Entertainment companies established in 1999
1999 establishments in Thailand
Anime companies